Walter Selby Buckmaster (16 October 1872 – 30 October 1942) was a British polo player in the 1900 Summer Olympics and in the 1908 Summer Olympics.

Biography
He was born on 16 October 1872 in Wimbledon, Surrey, the son of Thomas Walter Buckmaster (1845–1873) and Emma Caroline Venables (1848–1875). His father's sister, Maria Sarah Buckmaster was the mother of Alfred North Whitehead, the renowned mathematician and philosopher.  Buckmaster was educated at Repton and Trinity College, Cambridge. He played association football for both Repton and Cambridge and was a member and later Captain of the Cambridge polo team.

From Cambridge he had a career in the stock exchange joining with a fellow old Old Reptonian, Charles Armytage-Moore to become a founding partner in Buckmaster & Moore. He kept up his interest in sport particularly polo, and in 1900 he was part of the BLO Polo Club Rugby Polo at the 1900 Summer Olympics polo team which won the silver medal. In 1908 as a member of the Hurlingham Club he won the Olympic silver medal again. Buckmaster was a member of the winning team in the International Polo Cup, (also called the Newport Cup and the Westchester Cup) in 1902 playing at Hurlingham. The trophy was created in 1876 and was played for by teams from the United States and Great Britain.

He married Ida Sarah Blyth in June 1896 in St Marylebone Church, London. They had two daughters, Eulalie Agnes Selby in 1901 and Beryl Evelyn Tracey in 1904. Although he was over age (42), he served in the Great War (1914–1918) in the Service Sanitaire (Ambulance), attached to the French Army.

Buckmaster lived initially in London's Mayfair at addresses in South and Stratton Streets during the war years and early 1920s. In 1928 moved to the country living at Moreton Manor, Moreton Morrell and became Master of the Warwickshire Foxhounds. He died on 30 October 1942 at Warwick aged 70.

References

Sources 
 The London Gazette, 2 April 1926, Buckmaster & Moore Partnership Notice 
 The London Gazette, 26 March 1929, Buckmaster & Moore Partnership Notice 
 The New York Times, 30 April 1913, Headline: ‘ENGLISH TEAM POLO TEAM LOSES BUCKMASTER’ 
 The New York Times, 4 May 1914, Headline: ‘POLO INVADERS WORRIED’
 Bailey's Magazine of Sports & Pastimes: No. 486 August 1900 Vol. LXXIV, Brief biographical article plus full length image in Polo kit
 Book: 'Hints for Polo Combination', with Captain Lionel Sadleir-Jackson, London, Vinton & Co. 1910,
 National Portrait Gallery: Walter Selby Buckmaster, by Ernest Clarence Elliott, for Elliott & Fry collotype, published 1904 acquired, 1984 
 Vanity Fair Print: Walter S. Buckmaster, dated 4 September 1907 The Caption Reads 'Buck' 
 Olympic Sports – Polo 1900/1908: 
 Newspaper cutting: Boston Evening Transcript, 14 April 1913 (WS Buckmaster Hurt after fall) 
 Newspaper cutting: The New York Times, 10 August 1913 (Walter Buckmaster hurt after car crash)

External links

 Westminster Abbey 'BANNER OF ST EDWARD THE CONFESSOR' This was designed by Christopher Webb and presented in 1945 by Eulalie Buckmaster in memory of her father. On a plate on the banner pole is the inscription "In memory of Walter Selby Buckmaster October 16, 1872: October 30, 1942". It is of cloth of gold embroidered in rich silks with a figure of St Edward the Confessor holding a model of the Abbey which he built and a charter of foundation. The shields of arms of St Peter, St John the Evangelist, the Abbey monastery and the Collegiate Church are shown.
 British Red Cross Society; World War, 1914–1918, Author Laurence Binyon, Hodder & Stoughton, London (FOR DAUNTLESS FRANCE an account of Britain's aid to the French wounded and victims of the war -reference to W S Buckmaster) 
 Mr. Poilu Notes and Sketches with the Fighting French, Herbert Ward, Hodder & Stoughton, London (references to Walter Buckmaster)

1872 births
1942 deaths
English polo players
Polo players at the 1900 Summer Olympics
Polo players at the 1908 Summer Olympics
Olympic polo players of Great Britain
Olympic silver medallists for Great Britain
International Polo Cup
People educated at Repton School
Alumni of Trinity College, Cambridge
English stockbrokers
Medalists at the 1908 Summer Olympics
Medalists at the 1900 Summer Olympics
Olympic medalists in polo